Carlos Ovidio Lanza Martínez (born 15 May 1989) is a Honduran professional footballer who plays as a forward for Honduran club Juticalpa F.C. and the Honduras national team.

Honduras national team
Lanza was called to represent the Honduras national football team in the 2017 CONCACAF Gold Cup

Honours and achievements

Juticalpa
 Liga de Ascenso:
 Winners (3): 2012–13 A, 2014–15 A, 2014–15 C
 Runners-up (1): 2013–14 C
 Honduran Cup:
 Winners (1): 2015–16
 Honduran Supercup:
 Runners-up (1): 2016

References

External links
 

1989 births
Living people
Honduran footballers
Honduras international footballers
Association football forwards
Liga Nacional de Fútbol Profesional de Honduras players
Juticalpa F.C. players
2017 CONCACAF Gold Cup players
People from Francisco Morazán Department